Jessica Jislová (born 28 July 1994) is a Czech biathlete. She has competed in the Biathlon World Cup, and represented the Czech Republic at the Biathlon World Championships 2016.

Biathlon results
All results are sourced from the International Biathlon Union.

Olympic Games
0 medals

World Championships
0 medals

References

1994 births
Living people
Czech female biathletes
Olympic biathletes of the Czech Republic
Biathletes at the 2018 Winter Olympics
Biathletes at the 2022 Winter Olympics
Sportspeople from Jablonec nad Nisou
Biathletes at the 2012 Winter Youth Olympics